Kupnoor (ಕುಪನೂರ) is a village in Chincholi Taluk in Gulbarga District of Karnataka, India. It comes under Kupnoor Panchayath and belongs to Gulbarga Division . It is located 74 km towards East from District headquarters Gulbarga and 585 km from State capital Bangalore.

Importance
Kupnoor (ಕುಪನೂರ) is known for Lord Mallikarjun Temple. 
Temple celebrates number of festivals and Annual Jatra (ಜಾತ್ರೆ )  is celebrated during Makar Sankranti which is unique among all the festivals. Temple attracts several hundred devotees from the surrounding villages.

Demographics
Kannada is the Local Language here. Total population of Kupnoor is 1694 as per Population Census 2011. Males are 851 and Females are 843 living in 316 Houses.

References
http://vijaykarnataka.indiatimes.com/district/kalaburagi/-/articleshow/28827636.cms

Gulbarga

Villages in Kalaburagi district